The sixth season of the French version of Dancing with the Stars  premiered on TF1 on October 24, 2015, a little over a year after the fifth season. This time, 10 celebrities are paired with 10 professional ballroom dancers, less than the 11 of the previous season. Vincent Cerutti will not return as the main host for the season, being replaced by Sandrine Quétier, while Quétier's previous spot will be taken over by Season 4 contestant Laurent Ournac. Meanwhile, Fauve Hautot, one of the program's most popular dancers, was promoted to the position of judge, due to Season 5 judge M. Pokora being too busy with his concert tour.

Participants
The names of eight allegedly participating celebrities were leaked by the media in the third week of June 2015, with several more names leaking over the following weeks, with many being correct but others, like TV personalities Igor and Grichka Bogdanoff, actor Issa Doumbia, singer Larusso, model and actress Victoria Silvstedt or YouTube personality Norman Thavaud, ending up being false.

Former footballer Djibril Cissé was the first celebrity confirmed by broadcast channel TF1, on July 9, seven days after his name leaked, followed by singer/actor Vincent Niclo on July 21, TV actress Fabienne Carat on August 28, YouTube personality Marie 'EnjoyPhoenix' Lopez on September 2, Singer/impressionist Véronic DiCaire on September 8, Singer Loïc Nottet on September 11, Actor Thierry Samittier on September 14, singer/actress Priscilla Betti on September 21, Model/singer Olivier Dion on September 23 and finally Miss France 2007 first runner-up Sophie Vouzelaud on September 29.

TV presenter Karine Ferri had initially signed on for the season, but had to back out due to pregnancy so her spot was taken over by Priscilla Betti.

Scoring

Red numbers indicate the couples with the lowest score for each week.
Blue numbers indicate the couples with the highest score for each week.
 indicates the couples eliminated that week.
 indicates the winning couple.
 indicates the runner-up couple.
 indicates the third place couple.
 indicates the show was cancelled due to national mourning

Averages 
This table only counts dances scored on the traditional 40-point scale. Starting from week 3, both technical and artistic scores are tallied.

Highest and lowest scoring performances
The best and worst performances in each dance according to the judges' marks are as follows (starting from week 3, the average of the technical and artistic scores is used):

Couples' Highest and lowest scoring performances
According to the traditional 40-point scale (starting from week 3, the average of the technical and artistic scores is used):

Styles, scores and songs

Week 1 

 Individual judges scores in the chart below (given in parentheses) are listed in this order from left to right: Fauve Hautot, Jean-Marc Généreux, Marie-Claude Pietragalla, Chris Marques.

Running order

Week 2 : Personal Story Week 

 Individual judges scores in the chart below (given in parentheses) are listed in this order from left to right: Fauve Hautot, Jean-Marc Généreux, Marie-Claude Pietragalla, Chris Marques.

Running order

Week 3 : 80's 

 Individual judges scores in the chart below (given in parentheses) are listed in this order from left to right: Fauve Hautot, Jean-Marc Généreux, Marie-Claude Pietragalla, Chris Marques.

Running order

Week 4
Due to the November 2015 Paris attacks happening the night before, DALS announced that the week four show was cancelled.

Week 5 : Mythic Dance 

 Individual judges scores in the chart below (given in parentheses) are listed in this order from left to right: Fauve Hautot, Jean-Marc Généreux, Marie-Claude Pietragalla, Chris Marques.

Running order

Week 6 : Disney Night 

 Individual judges scores in the chart below (given in parentheses) are listed in this order from left to right: Fauve Hautot, Jean-Marc Généreux, Marie-Claude Pietragalla, Chris Marques.

Running order

Week 7 : Switch 

 Individual judges scores in the chart below (given in parentheses) are listed in this order from left to right: Fauve Hautot, Jean-Marc Généreux, Marie-Claude Pietragalla, Chris Marques, Audience

Running order

Duos

Week 8: Dance trio week 

 Individual judges scores in the chart below (given in parentheses) are listed in this order from left to right: Fauve Hautot, Jean-Marc Généreux, Marie-Claude Pietragalla, Chris Marques

Running order

Week 9 Semi-Finals 
 Individual judges scores in the chart below (given in parentheses) are listed in this order from left to right: Fauve Hautot, Jean-Marc Généreux, Marie-Claude Pietragalla, Chris Marques

Running order

Week 10 Finals 
 Individual judges scores in the chart below (given in parentheses) are listed in this order from left to right: Fauve Hautot, Jean-Marc Généreux, Marie-Claude Pietragalla, Chris Marques

Running order

Musical Guests

France television ratings

References

Season 06
2015 French television seasons